El Amarillo Airport ,  is an airstrip  east of Chaitén, a town in the Los Lagos Region of Chile. The Carretera Austral runs through the hamlet of El Amarillo, and passes the south end of the runway.

The airstrip is at the junction of two valleys, one running eastward from Chaitén, and the other, the valley of the Amarillo River, a glacial fed stream running south from the Chaitén Volcano.

The valleys open up to the southwest, but there is mountainous terrain in all other quadrants. The runway has an additional  of unpaved overrun on the south end.

See also

Transport in Chile
List of airports in Chile

References

External links
OpenStreetMap - El Amarillo
OurAirports - El Amarillo
SkyVector - El Amarillo
FallingRain - El Amarillo Airport

Airports in Los Lagos Region